DXRO (106.9 FM), broadcasting as 106.9 Radyo Natin, is a radio station owned by Manila Broadcasting Company and operated by Gaudes Advertising Agency. Its studios and transmitter are located at Balansag Residence, Purok 6, Brgy. South Poblacion, Maramag.

References

Radio stations in Bukidnon
Radio stations established in 2007